Claude C. Hopkins (1866–1932) was an American advertiser and author. He introduced the slogan in advertising and popularised the use of test campaigns, especially using coupons in direct mail, to properly attribute marketing spend.

Biography
Claude C. Hopkins was born in Hillsdale on April 24, 1866, received his education at Ludington and later attended a commercial school in Grand Rapids.

He worked for various advertising companies, including Bissell Carpet Sweeper Company, Swift & Company, and Dr. Shoop's patent medicine company. According to David Ogilvy, in 1907, at the age of 41, Hopkins was hired by Albert Lasker, owner of Lord & Thomas advertising, at a salary of $185,000 a year. Hopkins insisted copywriters research their clients' products and produce "reason-why" copy. He believed that a good product and the atmosphere around it was often its own best salesperson, and, so he was a great believer in sampling.

To track the results of his advertising,  and then tested headlines, offers, and propositions against one another. He used the analysis of these measurements to improve his ad results, driving responses and the cost effectiveness of his clients' advertising. While working for the Bissell Carpet Sweeper Company, Hopkins sent out five thousand letters recommending carpet sweepers as Christmas presents – one thousand people sent in orders.  He also convinced Bissell manufacturers to offer more variety of carpet sweepers, such as making them with twelve different types of wood.  Following these changes, Bissell sold two hundred fifty thousand in three weeks.

Hopkins has been credited with popularizing tooth brushing, as a result of his campaigns for Pepsodent.

His book Scientific Advertising was published in 1923, following his retirement from Lord & Thomas, where he finished his career as president and chairman. This book was followed, in 1927, by his autobiographical work My Life in Advertising. He died in September 1932 at Spring Lake.

External links
 Scientific Advertising Free Online Copy - All 21 Chapters & author photo

References

Marketing people
Marketing theorists
Advertising theorists
1866 births
1932 deaths